Epiplema quadristrigata is a moth of the family Uraniidae first described by Francis Walker in 1866. It is found in Australia and Sri Lanka.

Its wingspan is about 2 cm. The wings are off white with brown bands and lines. Hindwing margins each with two tails.

References

Moths of Asia
Moths described in 1866
Uraniidae